Beatrice "Bertie" Blackman (born 1982) is an Independent Australian singer, songwriter and guitarist. She rose to fame in 2004 with her debut album Headway, which came after years of prolific performances around Sydney's inner-city venues, where she developed a dedicated following.

Early life and influences
Bertie is the daughter of late, renowned Australian artist Charles Blackman, and grew up in the eastern Sydney suburbs of Bondi and Paddington. She attended International Grammar School in Ultimo. She began playing African percussion at the age of twelve and guitar at the age of fifteen.

Career achievements

Bertie appeared on the Australian music scene in 2004 with the single "Favourite Jeans," taken from her debut album, Headway, (2004) a folk-inspired acoustic album featuring musicians Cameron Deyell, Laurence Pike, and Cameron Undy, and was co-produced by Richard Belkner. This album established her as an Australian headliner alongside contemporaries Something for Kate, Ben Lee and Alex Lloyd. She wrote music for Australian films, including the title track to the 2008 production Hey, Hey, It's Esther Blueburger which saw her collaborate with prodigious Australian producer Paul Mac.

After forming a new band with Neal Sutherland, Evan Mannell and Cameron Deyell, she made her second album Black (2006) and received positive reviews and high rotation on Triple J and demonstrated Blackman's move away from folk music to a focus on rock. This album was produced by well-known Australian producer, Paul McKercher (Augie March, Little Birdy)

In 2008, Bertie signed with newly formed Australian management company Forum 5 and began working on her third studio album, Secrets and Lies, which was recorded between Sydney and Melbourne. Musicians involved included Neal Sutherland, Evan Mannell and Ben Hauptmann, with producers Lee Groves (Goldfrapp, Gwen Stefani) and Francois Tetaz (Architecture in Helsinki, Gotye)

Her first single from the album, "Heart," was released on 10 April 2009. The song was added on high rotation on Australian radio station Triple J and nationwide on commercial radio network Nova as well as on regional and community stations across the country. Altogether, "Heart" was the 4th most added song on radio in the week of its release, and entered the Australian radio airplay charts at No. 67.

The album Secrets and Lies was the Triple J Feature Album for the week commencing 27 April 2009 Secrets and Lies entered the ARIA album charts at No. 72 and peaked at No. 49.

At the AIR Awards of 2009, Bertie Blackman received four nominations for 'Best Independent Single or EP', 'Breakthrough Independent Artist of the Year', 'Best Independent Album' and 'Best Independent Artist', winning 'Breakthrough Independent Artist of the Year'.

At the ARIA Music Awards of 2009, Blackman won the ARIA Award for Best Independent Release. In 2010, she released as a single a cover version of "Peek-a-Boo" from Siouxsie and the Banshees

Session and touring members

Discography

Studio albums

Extended plays

Remix albums

Singles

As featured artist

Promotional singles

Guest appearances

Music videos

As featured artist

Awards and nominations

AIR Awards
The Australian Independent Record Awards (commonly known informally as AIR Awards) is an annual awards night to recognise, promote and celebrate the success of Australia's Independent Music sector.

|-
| rowspan="4" | AIR Awards of 2009
| rowspan="2" | herself
| Best Independent Artist
| 
|-
| Breakthrough Independent Artist
| 
|-
| Secrets and Lies
| Breakthrough Independent Album
| 
|-
| "Heart"
| Best Independent Single/EP
|

ARIA Music Awards
The ARIA Music Awards is an annual awards ceremony that recognises excellence, innovation, and achievement across all genres of Australian music. 

|-
| 2009
| Secrets and Lies
| Best Independent Release
| 
|-

Australian Music Prize
The Australian Music Prize (the AMP) is an annual award of $30,000 given to an Australian band or solo artist in recognition of the merit of an album released during the year of award. The commenced in 2005.

|-
| 2009
|Secrets and Lies
| Australian Music Prize
| 
|-

J Award
The J Awards are an annual series of Australian music awards that were established by the Australian Broadcasting Corporation's youth-focused radio station Triple J. They commenced in 2005.

|-
| J Awards of 2009
| Secrets and Lies
| Australian Album of the Year
| 
|-
| rowspan="2"| J Awards of 2012
| Pope Innocent X
| Australian Album of the Year
| 
|-
| "Boy"
| Australian Video of the Year
|

References

External links

 

1982 births
Place of birth missing (living people)
Living people
ARIA Award winners
Australian singer-songwriters
21st-century Australian singers